Jewish Roots in Ukraine and Moldova (full title: Jewish Roots in Ukraine and Moldova: Pages from the Past and Archival Inventories) is a book created by genealogist Miriam Weiner and co-published by The Miriam Weiner Routes to Roots Foundation and YIVO Institute for Jewish Research. A searchable database of updated archival holdings listed in the book is available in the Archive Database on the Routes to Roots Foundation website.

Overview 
In 1999, in official cooperation with the Ukraine State Archives (Ukraïnskyi derzhavnyi arkhiv) and the Moldova National Archives (Arhivă Naţională a Republicii Moldova), Weiner authored and published Jewish Roots in Ukraine and Moldova. The book includes archival holdings of the Ukraine State Archives and its branch archives throughout the country and the Moldova National Archives in Chișinău as well as local town hall documents throughout Ukraine and Moldova. The book also features document examples, maps, antique  postcards depicting towns and daily life, and modern-day photographs. There are individual town listings for localities throughout both countries.

The book includes an inventory of 1,392 towns and over 5,000 record entries for these towns. Sources of the material were the Ukrainian State Archives, Moldova National Archives, Ministry of Justice (ZAGS) in Ukraine and Moldova, Polish State Archives (AGAD in Warsaw), Urzad Stanu Cywilnego (Warsaw-Srodmiescie), and the Jewish Historical Institute in Warsaw. There are over 1,200 images in the book, of which there are 970 color photos of 190 towns, 121 black and white photos, 115 document examples, and 20 color maps.

The archives of Ukraine and Moldova were not accessible to the public for genealogical research purposes until the two countries gained independence in 1991. Once available, the ability to access even one birth record could take more than a week. Weiner made repeated visits to Ukraine and was aided by the former mayor of Otaci, Moldova, who served as a driver and translator. The book and the Routes to Roots Archive Database are the only known town-by-town inventories of archival documents (published in English) in that these lists were officially sanctioned by the directors of both the State Archives and Ministry of Justice (includes local town hall archives) in Ukraine and Moldova. The Ukrainian State Archives commented, "We thank Ms. Weiner for her outstanding work in publishing (in English) the first guide to archival inventories in Ukraine to be officially sanctioned by the Ukrainian State Archives. After compiling this material, Ms. Weiner submitted the draft archival inventories, which were then sent out to our archivists for review. They have done so to the best of their abilities. We consider the verification process by our archivists essential to the validity of any publication about our holdings."

Jewish Roots in Ukraine and Moldova took over seven years to complete. Weiner worked with two directors of the State Archives of Ukraine, Borys Ivanenko and Dr. Ruslan Pyrih, and collaborated with archivists throughout Ukraine to compile the information for the book. The Director of the Moldovan National Archives, Antonina A. Berzoy, contributed an article on the archives there, as did other regional scholars and experts.

Reception 

Jewish Roots in Ukraine and Moldova was the first work of its kind, as it collected details on archival documents from Ukraine and Moldova that had previously been deemed inaccessible or fundamentally lost. The book also serves multiple functions, so its diversity of offerings often made categorizing what the book was difficult. In the New York Jewish Genealogical Society, Inc.'s publication, DOROT, their detailed review focused on the extensive scope of the materials presented in the book: over 1,200 images of almost 200 towns, and the inclusion of over 5,000 documents of almost 1,400 towns.

Jewish Standard noted the fact that Jewish Roots in Ukraine and Moldova presents a wide range of information that is both useful and interesting.

The New York Times praised the book for being lavishly illustrated, voluminous encyclopedic guides that provide glimpses of life in Poland before World War II.

At the New York City book launch that was held at the Consulate of Ukraine in September 1999, Dr. Ruslan Pyrih, director of the Main Archival Administration of Ukraine, stressed the importance of the book not just from a genealogical perspective, but from a historical perspective.

Prior to her genealogy, Weiner was the Executive Director at the "American Gathering of Jewish Holocaust Survivors" in New York City and her book "Jewish Roots in Ukraine and Moldova" was featured in the AGJHS publication "Together" where it was lauded as "Another Masterwork of Love and Remembrance."

Awards 
 1999: Jewish Book Council, National Jewish Book Award, Reference (Finalist) for Jewish Roots in Ukraine and Moldova
 2000: Association of Jewish Libraries, AJL Research and Special Libraries Division Reference Award for Jewish Roots in Ukraine and Moldova
 2000: International Association of Jewish Genealogical Societies, Outstanding Contribution to Jewish Genealogy via Print for Jewish Roots in Ukraine and Moldova

Selected excerpts 

Note: Jewish Roots in Ukraine and Moldova is out of print. Miriam Weiner's non-profit Routes to Roots Foundation  has made excerpts from the book available on the organization's website

Ukraine

Moldova

See also 
 Jewish Roots in Poland

References

External links 
 Routes to Roots Foundation
 Jewish Roots in Ukraine and Moldova at Routes to Roots Foundation
 Routes to Roots Foundation's Archive Database – search includes Ukraine and Moldova
 Routes to Roots Foundation's Image Database – search includes Ukraine and Moldova

1999 non-fiction books
History books about the Holocaust
Books about cultural geography
Gazetteers
Books about Ukraine
Moldovan culture
Jewish Moldovan history
Jewish Ukrainian history